The Wind from Wyoming is a Canadian black comedy film, directed by André Forcier and released in 1994.

The film centres on a dysfunctional family whose efforts at finding and keeping love become tangled up with a stage hypnotist performing at the local hotel. Daughter Léa (Sarah-Jeanne Salvy) is in unrequited love with Reo (Martin Randez), a boxer who has instead entered a relationship with her mother Lizette (France Castel), while her sister Manon (Céline Bonnier) has a crush on Chester Celine (François Cruzet), a writer she has never met, and her father Marcel (Michel Côté) remains hurt by Lizette's betrayal of him. They all enlist Albert the Great (Marc Messier) to hypnotize their respective love interests, but the effort backfires and forces them to deal with unintended consequences.

The film premiered at the Montreal World Film Festival in 1994, winning the award for Best Canadian Film and the International Critics Prize. Forcier was shortlisted for Best Director at the 15th Genie Awards, At the Rendez-vous du cinéma québécois in 1995, Forcier won Best Screenplay and Salvy won the Revelation of the Year award for emerging performers; the film was also a nominee for Best Picture, but did not win.

References

External links

1994 films
Canadian comedy-drama films
Films directed by André Forcier
Canadian black comedy films
French-language Canadian films
1990s Canadian films